William Van Waters was a member of the Wisconsin State Assembly.

Biography
Van Waters was born on October 7, 1817 in Hounsfield, New York. He later settled in Hamilton, Wisconsin, where he was a farmer.

Political career
Van Waters was a member of the Assembly during the 1877 session. Previously, he had been an unsuccessful candidate in 1874. Additionally, Van Waters was Chairman of the Town Board (similar to city council) of Hamilton. He was a Democrat.

References

People from Hounsfield, New York
People from La Crosse County, Wisconsin
Democratic Party members of the Wisconsin State Assembly
Mayors of places in Wisconsin
Wisconsin city council members
Farmers from Wisconsin
1817 births
Year of death missing